Putna is a commune in Suceava County, in the historical region of Bukovina, northeastern Romania. It is composed of two villages, namely Gura Putnei and Putna. The Putna Monastery, Putna River, and the cave of Daniil Sihastrul are located in this commune.

Late modern period history 

As it is the case of other rural settlements from the countryside of Suceava County, Putna was previously inhabited by a sizable German community, more specifically by Zipser Germans (part of the larger Bukovina German community) during the late Modern Age up until the mid 20th century, starting as early as the Habsburg period and, later on, the Austro-Hungarian period. The German community was primarily significant in Gura Putnei.

Politics and administration

Communal council 

The commune's current local council has the following political composition, according to the results of the 2020 Romanian local elections:

Gallery

References 

Communes in Suceava County
Localities in Southern Bukovina